Tennis Europe (formerly known as the European Tennis Association) was formed in Rome, Italy on 31 May 1975 by a group of 17 European national tennis federations as a regional governing body for the sport of tennis and under the auspices of the International Tennis Federation. It is the world's largest regional association of the sport's governing body, the International Tennis Federation, with 50 member states in 2015.

Based in Basel, Switzerland, the organisation takes an active role in all aspects of the European game, executing tasks delegated by the ITF, and also by organizing a number of competitions and events independently from the ITF, such as European Tennis Championships.

Francesco Ricci Bitti was President of Tennis Europe from 1993 to 1999.

Ivo Kaderka was elected as President until 2024 at elections in September 2021. The Chief Executive Officer is Thomas Hammerl.

In reaction to the 2022 Russian invasion of Ukraine, Tennis Europe suspended from membership both the Russian Tennis Federation and the Belarus Tennis Federation. Teams representing Russia and Belarus were therefore ineligible to compete at all Tennis Europe events (including Winter & Summer Cups, European Beach Tennis, and Senior Club Championships). All Tennis Europe events in Russia and Belarus were suspended, including the European Junior Tennis Championships (16 & Under) in Moscow, and delegates from both countries were not eligible to attend the 2022 Annual General Meeting of Tennis Europe.

Membership

Events

Tennis Europe supports, manages, and sanctions over 1,200 international tennis events across the continent each year:

Junior events 
Tennis Europe Junior Tour (480 individual events for players aged 16/14/12 & Under)
These include some of the sport's best-known and most prestigious tournaments for players of these age groups, including Les Petits As (FRA) and Avvenire (ITA).

European Junior Championships (18/16/14 & Under) 
Tennis Europe Summer Cups (18/16/14 & Under) 
Tennis Europe Summer Cups by Dunlop (12 & Under) 
Tennis Europe Winter Cups by Dunlop (16/14 & Under)
Tennis Europe Junior Masters (16/14 & Under) 
ITF/Tennis Europe Development Championships (14 & Under) 
12 & Under Festival

Seniors' events 
European Tournaments, part of ITF European Seniors Circuit 
European Senior Championships (all official age categories) 
European Senior Opens (indoor and outdoor; all official age categories) 
European Seniors' Clubs Championships (Men 35/40/45/55/60/65/70 Women 40/50/60)

Professional circuits 
Tennis Europe's Professional Tennis Department is the service point for all European Men's and Women's Tournaments of the ITF World Tennis Tour, incorporating Men's professional events of $15,000 or $25,000 in prize money, as well as Women's events ranging from $15,000 to $100,000.

The Professional Tennis Department is in charge of over 600 events in Europe each year, comprising a total prize money fund of around $12,000,000.

Various 
Tennis Europe cooperates with the ITF in the establishment the ITF Junior Circuit Calendar (18 & Under) and in the organisation of the European Beach Tennis Championships.

References

External links
 Tennis Europe

 
Tennis organizations
Sports organizations established in 1976
Tennis Europe
1976 establishments in Europe